Bulla Island, also Xara Zira, Khara Zira or Khere Zire, is an island south of the Bay of Baku, Caspian Sea. It is the largest island of the Baku Archipelago, located off Baku, Azerbaijan.

Geography
This Island has a spit extending southwestward. The island has akdalaite and aluminium deposits and a mud volcano.

Fossil fuels
The island is a centre for the nearby offshore gas development of the Bulla Deniz gas field, in production since 1968.

See also

Petroleum industry in Azerbaijan

References

Islands of Azerbaijan
Islands of the Caspian Sea
Mud volcanoes of Azerbaijan
Uninhabited islands of Azerbaijan